Queen Munseong of the Suncheon Bak clan was a Later Baekje royal family member as the youngest maternal granddaughter of Gyeon Hwon who became a Goryeo queen consort as the second wife of King Jeongjong. She was the mother of his children, Prince Gyeongchunwon and a daughter who would marry Wang Imju, her half-uncle. Queen Munseong was the youngest sister, along with Lady Dongsanwon and Queen Mungong.

In popular culture
Portrayed by Kim Hyo-joo in the 2002–2003 KBS TV series The Dawn of the Empire.

References

External links
Queen Munseong on Encykorea .
문성왕후 on Doosan Encyclopedia .

Royal consorts of the Goryeo Dynasty
Korean queens consort
Year of birth unknown
Year of death unknown
10th-century Korean people